Chempakaraman Pillai (alias Venkidi; 15 September 1891 – 26 May 1934) was an Indian-born political activist and revolutionary. Born in Thiruvananthapuram, to Tamil Pillai parents, he left for Europe as a youth, where he spent the rest of his active life as an Indian nationalist and revolutionary.

Although his life was mired in controversies, including a squabble with Adolf Hitler, information on his life in Europe was sketchy in the immediate years after his death. More information has come out in recent years.

Chempakaraman Pillai is credited with the coining of the salutation and slogan "Jai Hind" in the pre-independence days of India. The slogan is still widely used in India.

Early life
Pillai was born into a Tamil Pillai family in Thiruvananthapuram, capital of the former kingdom of Travancore in the modern state of Kerala. His parents, Chinnaswami Pillai and Nagammal, hailed from Nanjilnadu (in present-day Kanyakumari District).

In Europe
Pillai attended ETH Zurich from October 1910 until 1914, pursuing a diploma in Engineering. After the outbreak of the First World War, he founded the International Pro-India Committee and based its headquarters in Zürich, appointing himself president in September 1914. During the same period an Indian Independence Committee was formed in Berlin by a group of Indian expatriates in Germany. This latter group was composed of Virendranath Chattopadhyaya, Mahatma Gandhi, Bhupendranath Dutta, A. Raman Pillai, Taraknath Das, Maulavi Barkatullah, Chandrakant Chakravarty, M. Prabhakar, Birendra Sarkar, and Heramba Lal Gupta.

In October 1914, Pillai moved to Berlin and joined the Berlin Committee, merging it with his International Pro-India Committee as the guiding and controlling institution for all pro-Indian revolutionary activities in Europe. Lala Har Dayal was also persuaded to join the movement. Both of them cooperated with the German Intelligence Bureau for the East and helped creating German propaganda directed at Indian PoWs in German camps, particularly the Halbmondlager. Soon branches sprang up in Amsterdam, Stockholm, and Washington, as well as in many other parts of Europe and the Americas.

SMS Emden bombing of British Madras

On 22 September 1914, The , a German warship commanded by Captain Karl von Muller entered the waters off the coast of Madras, and bombed the facilities near the Madras harbour and slipped back into the ocean. The British were taken aback in this sudden attack. His family stated that Pillai coordinated the German attack with his personal presence in the SMS Emden, though this is not the official view. In any case, it is widely believed that Pillai and some Indian revolutionaries had a hand in the SMS Emden bombing of Madras.

War activities

The Indian Independence Committee ultimately became involved in the Hindu–German Conspiracy along with the Ghadar Party in the United States. The German foreign office under Kaiser Wilhelm II funded the Committee's anti-British activities. Chempakaraman and A. Raman Pillai, both from Travancore and both students at German universities, worked together on the Committee. Pillai later allied with Indian National Army chief Subhas Chandra Bose.

Many of Pillai's letters to A. Raman Pillai, then a student in the University of Göttingen, were kept by Raman Pillai's son Rosscote Krishna Pillai. The letters reveal some aspects of Pillai's life in Germany between 1914 and 1920, as does one of July 1914, calling upon Indian soldiers in the British Indian Army to rise in revolt and fight against the British.

After the end of World War I and Germany's defeat, Pillai stayed in Germany, working as a technician in a factory in Berlin; when Netaji Subhas Chandra Bose visited Vienna, Pillai met him and explained his plan of action.

Foreign Minister of Provisional Government of India

Pillai was the foreign minister of the Provisional Government of India set up in Kabul, Afghanistan on 1 December 1915, with Raja Mahendra Pratap as President and Maulana Barkatullah as Prime Minister. However, the defeat of the Germans in the war shattered the hopes of the revolutionaries, and the British forced them out of Afghanistan in 1919.

During this time, the Germans were helping the Indian revolutionaries from their own motives. Though the Indians made it clear to the Germans that they were equal partners in their fight against the common enemy, the Germans wanted to use the revolutionaries' propaganda work and military intelligence for their own purposes.

In 1907, Pillai coined the term "Jai Hind", which was adopted as a slogan of the Indian National Army in the 1940s at the suggestion of Abid Hasan. After India's independence, it emerged as a national slogan.

Marriage and death
In 1931, Pillai married Lakshmi Bai of Manipur, whom he had met in Berlin. Unfortunately they had a short life together, as Pillai soon fell ill. There were symptoms of slow poisoning and he went to Italy for treatment. He died in Berlin on 28 May 1934. Lakshmibai brought Pillai's ashes to India in 1935 where they were later ceremonially immersed in Kanyakumari with full state honours. It was Pillai's final wish that his ashes be sprinkled in Nanjilnadu (Kanyakumari), his family's native place.

References

External links

Heike Liebau: "„Unternehmungen und Aufwiegelungen“: Das Berliner Indische Unabhängigkeitskomitee in den Akten des Politischen Archivs des Auswärtigen Amts  (1914–1920)." In: MIDA Archival Reflexicon (2019), ISSN 2628-5029, 1–11.

1891 births
1934 deaths
Indian revolutionaries
Hindu–German Conspiracy
People from Thiruvananthapuram
People from Kanyakumari district
History of Kerala
Indian independence activists from Kerala
Emigrants from British India to Germany